Čaška is a village in the Republic of North Macedonia. It is the seat of the Čaška Municipality.

Near the village, historians from the Republic of North Macedonia found a 6,000-year-old flute called the "Globular Flute".

Demographics
On the 1927 ethnic map of Leonhard Schulze-Jena, the village is shown as a Christian Bulgarian village. According to the 2021 census, the village had a total of 1,390 inhabitants. Ethnic groups in the village include:
Macedonians 1,390
Persons for whom data are taken from administrative sources 59
Serbs 23
Albanian 1
Vlachs 1
Others 6

References

Villages in Čaška Municipality